Swiz was an American hardcore punk band formed in 1987 in Washington, D.C., United States.

History 

The founding members were Shawn Brown (vocals) and Ramsey Metcalf (guitar), who later added Nathan Larson (bass), Alex Daniels (drums) and Jason Farrell (guitar). Before Swiz formed, Brown had been the original vocalist for Dag Nasty. Metcalf departed shortly after the band recorded its first demo and Swiz continued as a four-piece.

Getting started 
The band started with the goal to move away from the Revolution Summer movement that had emerged with the Washington, D.C. punk scene in 1985. Members felt the intensity and aggressiveness had decreased with the new wave of punk music and felt they resonated more with hardcore punk.

The band's first show together was on June 25, 1987 and did five more before deciding Ramsey was not a good fit. They proceeded to put out an E.P and begin touring.

Releases 
They released its first 7", Down, at the end of 1987 and its self-titled LP was released by Sammich Records in 1988.  Swiz released its next album, Hell Yes, I Cheated, in 1989. The record also included a track by Fury, a side project that consisted of Farrell, Daniels, Brown (on bass), and Chris Thomson (formerly of Ignition, later of Circus Lupus), on vocals.  By the time Hell Yes, I Cheated was released in 1990, Larson had left the band and was replaced by Dave Stern.  This line-up recorded an EP in May 1990 but broke up shortly afterward.  The EP, titled With Dave, was released posthumously in 1992 by Jade Tree Records.  In 1993, Jade Tree also released No Punches Pulled, which contained the band's entire discography.  Also that year, THD Records released a 7" called Rejects, which contained unused tracks from the Down sessions.

Recent History 
Nathan Larson resurfaced with Shudder To Think and later went into soundtrack work. Jason Farrell and Dave Stern formed Bluetip in 1995. After Bluetip's demise, Farrell formed Retisonic and is also a graphic designer whose work has appeared on many records by a number of different bands. Alex Daniels played drums in Severin from 1990–1993. Shawn Brown fronted the band Jesuseater and currently works as a tattoo artist. In 1996, Brown, Farrell, Stern, and Daniels reunited under the name Sweetbelly Freakdown and released a 7" and an album on Jade Tree.

In 2012, Brown, Farrell, and Stern formed a new band called Red Hare.

On December 19, 2014, Swiz reunited for a surprise series of songs at a Red Hare show at Comet Ping Pong in Washington, DC. This line-up featured Brown, Farrell, Stern, and Daniels. This same Swiz line-up played an unannounced 30-minute set the next evening (December 20, 2014) at the Black Cat in Washington, DC, joining Soulside and Moss Icon for reunion sets.

Members 
 Shawn Brown – vocals (1987–1990, 2004, 2014)
 Jason Farrell – guitar (1987–1990, 2004, 2014)
 Ramsey Metcalf – guitar (1987)
 Nathan Larson – bass (1987–1990)
 Dave Stern – bass (1990, 2004, 2014)
 Alex Daniels – drums (1987–1990, 2004, 2014)

Discography

LPs 
 Swiz (Sammich Records, 1988)
 Hell Yes, I Cheated (Sammich Records, 1989)

Singles and EPs 
 "Down" 7" (Hellfire Records, 1987)
 "With Dave" 7" (Jade Tree, 1992)
 "Rejects" 7" (THD Records, 1993)
 "With Ramsey" (Jade Tree, 2004) – Demo recorded May 1987.

Compilation albums 
No Punches Pulled (Jade Tree, 1993)

References

External links 
 Swiz @ Jade Tree

Hardcore punk groups from Washington, D.C.
Musical groups established in 1987
Jade Tree (record label) artists